The Sava Hills are the eastern part of the Slovene Prealps. They are oriented in the east-west direction and are located to the north and south of the Sava River in central and eastern Slovenia, among the Ljubljana Basin to the west, the Celje Basin to the north, the Lower Carniola valley system and the Krško Basin to the south, and the Sotla Hills to the east.

The region has an average elevation of only , and an average inclination of 16.6°. It is water-rich, because the ground contains copious impermeable rocks, particularly sandstone and conglomerate at lower elevations, whereas at higher elevations, it mainly consists of limestone and dolomite. Predominantly deciduous forest covers almost two thirds of the area. The Sava flows through its central part from the west to the east. Notable rises along it are Kum to the south of the Sava, Mount Čemšenik, Javor, and Mrzlica to the north of the Sava and to the west of the Savinja River, and Bohor and Lisca to the north of the Sava and the east of the Savinja. The Savinja flows through the hills transversely from the Celje Basin and joins the Sava at Zidani Most.

About 135,000 people live in the Sava Hills. The settlements Litija in the Litija Basin and Trbovlje, Zagorje ob Savi, and Hrastnik in the narrow Central Sava Valley are known by their mining and timber rafting past and the energetics industry. The town of Radeče at the beginning of the wider Lower Sava Valley is known after paper industry. Other economic activities in the region are services, forestry, and livestock production. A railroad links places along the Sava and another one links places along the Savinja, both joining at Zidani Most. Since 2005, a highway crosses the northern Sava Hills and connects the Ljubljana Basin and the Celje Basin through the Trojane Tunnel. A historically important old road crosses them over the Trojane Pass.

References

External links

Hills of Slovenia
Sava basin
Natura 2000 in Slovenia